Samuel White (1903/1904 – after 1929) was an English footballer who played as an outside right in the Football League for Darlington. Before joining Darlington, he was on the books of Leeds United and Hull City without playing in the League for either.

White was born in Newburn, Northumberland, the son of John White, an engineering fitter and turner, and his wife Barbara. At the time of the 1911 UK Census, the family was living in nearby Walbottle and the seven-year-old White was the fifth of nine surviving children. He played football for Newburn and for Annfield Plain before joining Second Division club Leeds United in May 1927. He played for Leeds' reserves in the Central League, but not for the first team, and moved on to Second Division Hull City a year later. Again, he never played for their first team, and after winger Billy Eden left for Sunderland in October 1929, Darlington signed White in his position. He scored twice from nine Third Division North matches, and was not retained at the end of the season.

White's older brother Bob also played in the Football League.

References

1900s births
Year of death missing
People from Newburn
Footballers from Tyne and Wear
English footballers
Association football wingers
Annfield Plain F.C. players
Leeds United F.C. players
Hull City A.F.C. players
Darlington F.C. players
English Football League players
Place of death missing
Newburn F.C. players